Iran has participated in the ABU Radio Song Festival trice. The Iranian broadcaster, Islamic Republic of Iran Broadcasting, has been the organiser of the Iranian entry since the country's debut in the contest in 2012.

History

2012
Islamic Republic of Iran Broadcasting and Soroush Multimedia Corp are founder members in the ABU Radio Song Festivals, having participated in the very first ABU Radio Song Festival 2012. A total of four songs were submitted by Iran to participate in the first festival, IRIB submitted two entries Man Brothers with "Iran (ایران)" and Heidar & Shokrollah Sepahvand & Nabi Razazadeh with "Tone of Joyful Music of Lorestan". Soroush Multimedia Corp submitted a further two songs, Mohsen Nafar with "Dast Afshan (دست افشان)" and Shayan Bohluli, Amin Alizadeh & Hamed Khodadadi with "The First Day of Spring". Only one of the four submissions was selected for the show, Man Brothers with "Iran (ایران)".

2014
Iran participated again in the 2014 festival in Colombo, Sri Lanka. A total of four songs were submitted to participate in the festival, the first song was presented on 18 March 2014, Mohammad Saveh with "Fountain of the Sun". On 19 March 2014 the remaining three Iranian entries were presented, Heshmatollah Rajabzadeh with "Larzan", Moghtada Gharbavi with "Bezar Asheget Bemoonam" and Peyman Talebi with "Wave of the Infinity". On 1 April 2014 it was revealed that two songs would represent Iran in Sri Lanka, Moghtada Gharbavi with "Bezar Asheget Bemoonam" and Peyman Talebi with "Wave of the Infinity".

2015
Iran did not participate in the third ABU Radio Song Festival in Myanmar, no reason for their withdrawal was given.

Participation overview 
Table key

See also
 Iran in the ABU TV Song Festival

References

Countries at the ABU Song Festival